Chastity Dotson (born 1986) is an American actress.

Filmography

Film
Kingston High (2002)
Submission (2006)
Premonition (2007)
Law Dogs (2007)
A Golden Christmas as Jill (2009)
The Undershepherd (2012)
Gully as Angela (2019)

Television
Veronica Mars as Nish Sweeney (2006–07)
Without a Trace as April (2007)
House of Payne (2009)
 Greys Anatomy 
Family Time (2014)
In the Cut as Angelique Peters (2015-)
Single Ladies as Roshanda Rollins (2015-)
Bosch as Keisha Russell (2016-)
Arrow as Onyx Adams (in "Next of Kin")
NCIS
Imposters as Gina (2017-2018)

References

External links

Living people
1986 births
21st-century American actresses
African-American actresses
American film actresses
American television actresses
21st-century African-American women
21st-century African-American people
20th-century African-American people
20th-century African-American women